The Head of the Republic of Tuva (formerly known as the President of the Republic of Tuva) is the highest office within the Republic of Tuva in Russia. The Head is Head of State and Head of Government of Tuva. The Head is elected by citizens of Russia residing in the republic. Term of service is five years.

List

The latest election for the office was held on 18 September 2016

References

External links
Russian republics

 
Tuva
Politics of Tuva